Nayot is a neighborhood in south-central Jerusalem established in 1960 by a group of English-speaking immigrants.

Etymology
The name Nayot (lit. "oases") appears six times in the Bible, in I Samuel (I Samuel 19:18).

History
Nayot was the first housing project in Jerusalem built by Anglo immigrants to Israel. Until an official name was announced in 1963, it was known as Hashikun Ha'anglo Saxi (the Anglo-Saxon neighborhood). English-speaking immigrants seeking housing in the 1950s formed a committee in 1957, and leased 16 dunams of land from the Jewish National Fund below the hill where the Israel Museum and the Knesset are located today, which was outside the boundaries of Jerusalem at the time.

Of the first 62 semi-detached homes built in 1960, fifty were purchased by families who immigrated to Israel from the United States and Canada. Many of the first tenants were diplomats, among them Simcha Dinitz. The architect was David Resnick, who won the Israel Prize for architecture in 1995.

The committee also set up a mortgage fund, which was unknown in Israel in those days. Fundraising in the United States brought in $100,000, and the Israeli government matched the sum, creating a fund of $200,000.

Landmarks
The Jerusalem Botanical Gardens is located in Nayot.

Notable residents
Shimon Agranat
Eliyahu Lankin

References

Neighbourhoods of Jerusalem